The 1908 United States presidential election in Mississippi took place on November 3, 1908. Voters chose 10 representatives, or electors to the Electoral College, who voted for president and vice president.

Mississippi overwhelmingly voted for the Democratic nominee, former U.S. Representative William Jennings Bryan, over the Republican nominee, Secretary of War William Howard Taft. Bryan won the state by a landslide margin of 83.6%. Mississippi would prove to be Bryan's second strongest state this year after only South Carolina.

Results

References

Mississippi
1908
1908 Mississippi elections